Kolah Kabud (also Romanized as Kolāh Kabūd) is a village in Hasanabad Rural District, in the Central District of Ravansar County, Kermanshah Province, Iran. At the 2006 census, its population was 233, in 47 families.

References 

Populated places in Ravansar County